Late Night with Seth Meyers is an American late-night news and liberal political satire talk show hosted by Seth Meyers on NBC. The show premiered on February 24, 2014, and is produced by Broadway Video and Universal Television. Airing weeknights at 12:37 a.m. ET/PT, it is the fourth iteration of NBC's Late Night franchise. 

The show stars bandleader Fred Armisen and the 8G Band, the show's house band. Late Night is produced by former Saturday Night Live producer Mike Shoemaker and executive-produced by Lorne Michaels. The show records from Studio 8G at 30 Rockefeller Plaza in New York City. Clips of Late Night are provided on YouTube.

History 
The series is the fourth incarnation of the Late Night franchise, originated by David Letterman. Seth Meyers was appointed host when Jimmy Fallon was announced to become the next host of The Tonight Show (currently The Tonight Show Starring Jimmy Fallon), where he succeeded the previous host Jay Leno one week after that. Meyers' first guests were fellow SNL alum and Weekend Update co-anchor Amy Poehler, then Vice President of the United States Joe Biden, and musical act A Great Big World. The show's house band, The 8G Band, features members of the indie bands Les Savy Fav and Girls Against Boys, and is typically led by SNL alum Fred Armisen.

On September 2, 2014, the show premiered on a redesigned set.

On January 13, 2016, NBC renewed Meyers' contract to remain as host through 2021.

On March 13, 2020, the show suspended production due to the COVID-19 pandemic in the United States. Beginning on March 30, 2020, the show was produced from Meyers' residence or from his parents-in-laws' summer home. Meyers returned to a reworked studio without a live audience on September 8, 2020. A live audience returned to the show on October 11, 2021.

On February 26, 2021, NBC renewed Meyers' contract to remain as host through 2025.

Production 
Late Night with Seth Meyers originates from NBC Studio 8G in the Comcast Building at 30 Rockefeller Center in New York City. The studio is housed directly above Studio 6B, the home of The Tonight Show Starring Jimmy Fallon; the combination created logistical challenges for executives, who were concerned about "sound bleed" (as the Comcast Building was built with steel girders, sound is too easily conducted floor to floor). As a result, The Tonight Show tapes at 5:00pm, and Late Night tapes later in the evening, at 6:30pm. The studio seats nearly 180 individuals, and is housed directly beside Studio 8H, longtime home of Saturday Night Live. Architectural Digest writes that the stage "strikes an Art Deco tone, with its illuminated proscenium arch reminiscent of the Chrysler Building's iconic crown." Seth's Late Night has a house band, called The 8G Band, and led by Fred Armisen who also acts as the show's sidekick. He also performs as backing and co-lead vocals, rhythm guitars, bass and drums. The other personnel in the band are Seth Jabour on lead guitars and backing vocals, Marnie Stern on lead and rhythm guitars and backing vocals, Syd Butler on bass, and Eli Janney on keyboards, programmer and lead vocals. Just before Marnie Stern took over for Fred Armisen as guitarist in 2015, the role of drummer was held by Kimberly Thompson, who has performed trumpets, backing vocals and melodicas since the premiere of Late Night on February 24, 2014. Guest performers, such as drummers The Pocket Queen and Larnell Lewis, are used for the entire week when Armisen has other commitments, and their residencies are promoted in each episode's logline on an equal level with the stage guests.

Production process 
8:30am The staff work on the episode's first act, which usually focuses on politics or other current events. A first draft is written by one of the writers, such as Sal Gentile, and Meyers goes over it to add to it or modify it.
11:00am The staff has a sketch meeting in which it plans non-political and longer lead-in segments, such as the popular recurring sketches "Extreme Dog Shaming" or "Ya Burnt". The staff use this opportunity to make relevant notes on the sketches.
12:00pm Meyers and producer Mike Shoemaker meet with the show's department heads for a production meeting in which graphics, costuming and pre-taping schedules for the episode's segments are discussed.
2:00pm – 4:00pm After Meyers reads an estimated 100 to 130 jokes with Shoemaker and a smaller group of monologue writers, he retreats to his office to hone the opening monologue and research the night's guests.
4:00pm The staff goes to the Late Night studio for a test run with an audience of people that the production assistants round up outside 30 Rockefeller Center. This test run gives Meyers the opportunity to discern which jokes are working.
4:30pm Any changes made in the early meeting are tested with the audience respondents, with fine-tune transitions made on-set by the writers.
5:00pm After the rehearsal, Meyers prepares for the real taping, which includes changing into his familiar attire and going over the cue cards.
5:45pm In his dressing room, Meyers re-reads his guests' biographies in order to find topics of conversation that they have not been asked about repeatedly. He has said, "If you ask them a question where they see you've done your homework, then they open up more."
6:00pm Meyers discusses any last-minute additions with the writers based on the day's events. Typically at least three or four notable news events occur between the first round of jokes to the taping, according to Meyers.
6:15pm As the band warms up, Meyers greets the episode's guests in the dressing rooms, while avoiding any pre-taping conversation that would rob the on-set interview of energy.
6:25pm Before the taping begins, Meyers goes out to the audience to greet them, asking individual members about themselves and sharing knowledge of the history of Studio 8G.
6:30pm Taping begins.

Show structure and segments 

The show opens with Ron McClary proclaiming "From 30 Rockefeller Plaza in New York, it's Late Night with Seth Meyers!" and announcing that night's guests and The 8G Band with Fred Armisen, and/or guest musicians. McClary introduces Meyers with "Ladies and gentlemen, Seth Meyers." Previously, the introduction to Meyers was "And now here he is, Seth Meyers!". Meyers performs a monologue from his desk based around recent news, punctuating jokes with on-screen images and video. For the first year and a half of the program, Meyers performed a traditional stand-up monologue, before changing to a seated, Weekend Update-style opening monologue. This segment is normally followed by a long-form desk piece, or an interaction with bandleader Fred Armisen. The desk piece then leads to a commercial break. After the first commercial, one of various recurring segments appears, followed by the first of the episode's guests, which usually include celebrities and actors, literary figures, people in fashion, artists, athletes, and politicians. The first guest may return after the second commercial break, or be followed by the second guest. The third commercial break is normally followed by either a musical guest or a segment featuring that night's regular guests. Alternatively, a third guest may be featured.

On some occasions, Meyers does not follow this pattern at all; rather, he will perform a monologue followed by a long series of interviews without other segments. This first occurred following the series finale of Parks and Recreation, an NBC sitcom starring Meyers' former co-anchor and close friend Amy Poehler. This occurred again with the cast of the then-upcoming film Sisters (which coincidentally also starred Poehler), although the episode featured a short desk segment between the monologue and interviews. An annual holiday tradition since the show's debut year has been an episode broadcast on Thanksgiving night in which the only guests are Meyers' parents, Hilary and Larry, and his younger brother Josh.

The show eventually increased its focus on politics. After Jon Stewart left The Daily Show in 2015, Meyers' program has gradually moved towards the "longer-form political comedy" style The Daily Show is known for. In an interview with journalist Chris Hayes, Meyers acknowledged this change, saying that the show was always intended to be politically minded, but when the show started, the creators opted to only gradually work the political material into the content to measure the amount of workload following the 24-hour news cycle would cause. It's been described as The Daily Show for people without basic cable.

Recurring segments 
A Closer Look: In a desk piece that normally follows, and is closely entwined with, the monologue, Meyers explains and satirizes a difficult or misunderstood political issue. One of Meyers' original visions for the show, "A Closer Look" has become the signature segment of Late Night. However, when it premiered, the crew could not sustain the long-form writing and intense research periods required to develop the segments. The segment typically appears on every episode except for those broadcast on Tuesday nights. Each segment features a broad topic which Meyers explains and jokes about, with frequent use of news clippings and video from network news. Depending on the topic, segments have ranged in length from three minutes to almost sixteen minutes; one edition in particular, airing the night after Election Day 2020, lasted a full twenty-one minutes.
A Couple Things: Meyers gives a few quick comments in response to, and pointing out the inaccuracies or hypocrisies of, a news story.
Actathalon: One of the night's guests, normally an established or applauded actor, participates in a series of challenges based on stereotypical movie tropes. Challenges in the ten event series include "looking in the mirror and wondering who you've become", "quitting a job angrily", "hanging up the phone then swiping everything off a desk", and "doing an interview for a movie that you know is horrible".
Amber Says What?: Staff writer Amber Ruffin discusses the news, ending each comment with "I was like, what," with various emphases (anger, confusion, shock, etc.) on the word "what."
Amber's Minute of Fury: As opposed to the multiple-topic format of "Amber Says What?", here staff writer Amber Ruffin focuses her ire on a singular topic, news event, or newsmaker.
At This Point In The Broadcast: Meyers shares an unpopular opinion while a "network apology" scrolls on the screen and is read by show announcer and staff writer Ben Warheit. The disclaimer states due to technical reasons, the segment could not be excised from the broadcast. While it's being read, Meyers is seen pantomiming a profane rant (no audio is heard from Meyers, outside of audience reaction) against mundane topics such as trees, exercising at the gym, or Netflix. This sketch is a parody of a message aired during reruns of a 1994 Saturday Night Live episode hosted by Martin Lawrence; his monologue in that episode, which included a rant about female hygiene, got him banned from the show.
Bad Sponsors: Meyers promotes the fake, horrible sponsors who supposedly give money to the show.
Back In My Day: Seth dons an old sweater, sits in an old chair, and reminisces about how things were simpler and better in "the good old days," even though those days were only a year or so ago.
The Check In: Seth discusses a political topic, particularly one relating to the Trump administration, that has not received much attention because it is not timely or spans multiple, smaller news stories. Examples include the Trump administration's relationship with religion or their response to the opioid crisis in America. This segment usually airs once a week on Tuesday nights in place of "A Closer Look," although there are weeks where it does not appear.
Clear the Air: Seth and a guest (most often a former Saturday Night Live cohort) sit down one-on-one and take turns seeking forgiveness for the bad things they've said or done to each other (e.g. Seth admitting to Rachel Dratch he bailed out on attending her birthday party, and Rachel admitting she had Seth arrested at the airport).
CORRECTIONS: Seth reads through comments the show receives on YouTube, and in this digital-only featurette responds to the commenters he "sort of lovingly" calls jackals, or corrects mistakes he made on-air during that week or previous weeks. A popular online segment (and filmed without a studio audience present), "CORRECTIONS" has been a two-time Emmy Award nominee for Outstanding Short Form Comedy, Drama or Variety Series (it's lost out to Carpool Karaoke: The Series on both occasions).
Day Drinking: Meyers takes a guest for drinks while asking questions and playing drinking games connected to the guest's work. Meyers has also taken the members of his family for drinks in the morning, seeing who has the best tolerance. Everyone in the family agreed that Seth's mother is the best drinker among them. The guests on this segment include Meyers' family, Ina Garten, Retta, Kelly Clarkson, Rihanna, the Jonas Brothers, Lorde, and Lizzo.
Deep Google: Meyers reads progressively deeper into the last pages of a Google search with "millions of results."
Fake Or Florida: a game show parody where contestants have to guess whether or not a bizarre crime or incident set in Florida was real. Any contestant from Florida proper is blindfolded in order to level the playing field. Score is kept with manatee cutouts on dowels stuck into a holder.
Fred Armisen: Whenever a Saturday Night Live alumnus is on the show, they tend to make fellow SNL vet and 8G Band leader Fred Armisen the butt of a joke, pretending not to remember him during their time at SNL or expressing a negative relationship with him. On the other hand, Seth allows Fred to exercise his ad-lib comedy skills, with such segments including:
Fred Armisen's Extremely Accurate TV Recaps: Seth attempts to prove that Fred is lying when he claims to watch every single episode of every TV show by reading him the title of a TV show and asking him to explain what it's about. Fred then makes up a lengthy and obviously incorrect description of the show. When he finishes, Seth explains what the show is actually about, upon which Fred will claim that his description was more accurate or that the description Seth read was a minor detail of the show that Fred simply left out.
Fred Judges a Book By Its Cover: Similar to the above "TV Recaps," only here Fred claims that, despite being busy with several projects, he's built an appreciation of literary fiction by just looking at a book's front cover. Seth then puts Fred to the test by showing the cover of an actual book. Though Fred's plot description is way off the mark, he still manages to connect it to the actual plot. (e.g. saying David Weber's science-fiction tome Uncompromising Honor is about an illegal car detailing operation).
Fred Talks: Seth claims to Fred he heard about his involvement in a new project (opening a store, working with a charity, etc.); when he asks if it's true, Fred says it is, but then elaborately twists the story into being about a service no one needs.
FredEx: If Fred is away from Late Night due to other projects, and "to keep him involved in the show when he's not here," Seth mails him a FedEx package containing costumes, wigs, or props, which serve as prompts for Fred to create a character on the spot.
Game of Jones: Seth and former Saturday Night Live regular Leslie Jones are huge fans of the TV series Game of Thrones, with the latter known for live-tweeting the show as it aired on HBO. On a few occasions during the show's run, Seth and Leslie sat down together to watch and comment on a GOT episode they had not seen in advance. Noted editions of the filmed segments include the bookend episodes of the series' 8th and final season, as well as a 2017 segment in which Conleth Hill, in full-on costume as Varys, surprises Leslie and joins in on the conversation.
Hey! Seth gets the attention of newsmakers and other figures in current events to deliver them strong words (e.g. Donald Trump, for falsely claiming voter fraud).
Jeff Wright conversations: In filmed segments, staff writer Jeff Wright appears as multiple figures or subjects in current events conversing with each other (e.g. the jurors who convicted Derek Chauvin, various COVID-19 vaccines awaiting a "job interview").
Joke Bucket: Rather than write the setups and then the punchlines for Seth's monologue jokes, his staff tends to write the punchlines ahead of time. Seeking to make lemonade from lemons, Seth pulls punchlines written on slips of paper from an aluminum "joke bucket" until they suitably match a joke setup from the news. A successful match causes Seth to staple the joke and punchline together, stamp it with his approval, ring a "joke bell," and put the match into a "completed joke bucket." Going through mismatches leads to the bucket emptying out before the last joke is matched, causing Seth to seek a match from the likes of a "joke volcano" or a "used joke lot."
Jokes Seth Can't Tell: When prefacing this segment, Seth notes the diverse makeup of the show's writing team, which sometimes writes jokes that he (being a straight, white male) could not deliver without facing criticism. Rather than have those jokes go untold, two of those writers, Amber Ruffin (a Black woman) and Jenny Hagel (a Puerto Rican lesbian) step in alongside Seth to finish the jokes he can't (the ladies alternate delivering punchlines after Seth reads the setups). The segment ends with Amber and Jenny coaxing Seth into telling a full joke (or, occasionally, a second joke after the first one falls flat). When he delivers the punchline, however, it's met with immediate shock by a chastising Amber and Jenny. Seth's defensive response, after Amber and Jenny said it'd be okay to tell the punchline ("Black women and lesbians are liars!"), was improvised, according to Hagel, by Seth during the segment's first rehearsal; it was left in during that night's taping and has closed the segment ever since.
The Kind of Story We Need Right Now: Giving his audience a respite from bleak current events, here Seth highlights unique, uplifting, and amusing news items. Such examples include a woman who played music by Metallica to scare away a threatening bobcat, and a man who successfully challenged a ticket for using his phone while driving (he was eating a McDonald's hash brown instead).
The Late Night Debate/Press Conference: During presidential debate season, Meyers is seated as a "moderator" and riffs comedic "questions" with actual footage of the participants within those debates taken out of context. Outside of that setting, Meyers does the same, but with White House press briefings and other news conferences.
The Leave Him Alone Guy: When Seth starts a segment of jokes about a certain newsmaker, a man in the audience (staff writer John Lutz) stands up and, sensing that the jokes Seth is about to tell will be mean-spirited in tone, loudly asks him to "leave him alone!" and instead make jokes about his own peculiarities and shortcomings ("If you have to make fun of somebody, make fun of me!").
One of My Writers Explains a Joke: Not every joke in Seth's monologue receives a warm response from the audience. For the jokes that really miss the mark (normally ones with bad puns for a punchline), Seth, feigning disappointment, calls on the carpet the staff writer who wrote the joke to explain it to the audience.
Point, Counterpoint: Staff writers Ally Hord and Amber Ruffin debate over topics in the news, but while Ally is serious and on-point, Amber goes lightheartedly off-topic with a term Ally had just used. For example, when discussing the Trump administration's attempts to bar transgender people from serving in the U.S. military, Ally calls it a "stunt" to distract from Donald Trump's personal scandals, to which Amber counterpoints with thoughts on how she loves cinematic action stunts. Ally often voices disappointment by Amber's straying, which is quickly defended by Seth ("You make a point, she makes a counterpoint, and that's how it works").
Popsicle Schtick: A lengthy and rarely-seen segment mainly used only on shows with few guests or when Meyers is performing ill, the show's writers and graphics departments come together to wrap around purposefully poorly-written jokes usually emblematic of the type seen on Popsicle sticks, with long and elaborate interludes performed by CGI popsicle sticks in costume, which have included parodies of Jesus Christ Superstar and Les Misérables. In one of his annual Thanksgiving night appearances, Seth's father Larry stated "Popsicle Schtick" was his least favorite segment on the show.
Really?! When Amy Poehler pays a visit, she and Seth reprise their Weekend Update segment in which the two lambast a current topic by angrily and varyingly exclaiming "really".
Second Chance Theatre: Meyers gives a fellow former Saturday Night Live cast member a chance to stage a sketch they wrote that never made it to air at SNL. Will Forte, Jason Sudeikis, and Andy Samberg have participated so far.
Seth Explains Teen Slang: Meyers takes current pop culture topics and changes them into words that he claims teenagers are using to describe things, followed by an example sentence.
Surprise Inspection! The military-themed title card isn't the only thing Seth shakes his head over in this segment that features actual jokes written by the show's staff that didn't reach monologue-level quality. Seth warns the audience that some of the jokes (which are followed by the responsible writer being identified) are dumb, baffling, or even patently offensive, but notes that "because of lot of [the writers] don't watch this show, they'll never know we're doing this."
This Week in Numbers: Meyers uses data, both real and fictional, to set up jokes on pop culture and the news.
Tiny Secret Whispers: Seth recommends to his studio crew, and his viewers, this (fictitious) murder mystery series he's hooked on, discussing its various actors, storylines, and intriguing plot twists, as well as the streaming video service he watches it on called "Butternut" which specializes in American shows featuring all-foreign casts playing Americans.
Venn Diagrams: Meyers looks at two different categories, using the spot where they overlap to tell a joke about pop culture and the news.
What Does Karen Know? Seth shows millennial-aged staff writer Karen Chee images she has not previously seen, primarily items and celebrities popular during her infancy or before her birth. The items are those that Generation X can immediately recognize, so the comedy comes in Karen guessing what they may be, such as a PalmPilot ("an ancient iPad?") or a Teddy Ruxpin doll ("It's an off-brand teddy bear?"), as well as Seth humorously trying to explain them to her. Karen returns the favor and shows Seth items that she grew up on but he and his older generation may not recognize.
The Wrong Take: Seth offers this compendium of the worst "hot take" opinions from "average citizen" interviews about issues that matter most to Americans.
Ya Burnt: Smoke in the studio means it's time for a roast: Meyers tells jokes about six to ten topics (displayed on-screen a la Pardon the Interruption), ending each joke with the signature line "ya burnt". Since the second installment, most weeks also feature an "unburnable" topic Seth praises rather than roasts. "Ya Burnt" is usually cued up with a mention of the study of migrating Amazonian tree frogs (a running gag that dates from Seth's Weekend Update run) that is always interrupted by a siren, and almost always ends with time running out right as Seth would have begun roasting a person or thing that would be considered in poor taste to mock (e.g. soup kitchen volunteers in a Thanksgiving-themed segment).

Live episodes 
In July 2016, it was announced that the show would produce two live episodes following the final nights of the Republican and Democratic National Conventions. The show is normally recorded live on tape (primarily), but too early in the day to feature content from each night's convention. As a result, Meyers opted to host the show live to have the first opportunity for a fresh take on how each convention ended.

The first live episode featured guests Leslie Jones and Carlo Mirarchi, as well as a live "Ya Burnt" segment. One of the roasting topics for the segment was "live television", in which Meyers stated that he was going to test the Standards & Practices division at NBC to see how well they could censor him live if he used swear words. Ultimately, a few swears were aired in the live version. Meyers also joked with Jones in her interview that she cannot swear like she normally does, because the show would be live. Despite this, Jones ultimately did swear in her interview, though the network censor caught it.

The second live episode featured guests Colin Jost, Michael Che, and Jessi Klein. The episode also featured a live "Jokes Seth Can't Tell" segment, in which writer Amber Ruffin used the phrase "bigger dicks though" as the punchline of a joke. Meyers appeared caught off-guard and chastised her for the use of the word, to which she responded by reminding him that the show is live so the network cannot stop them from saying it. Meyers repeated the line offhand later in the segment.

The third live episode followed the first presidential debate of the 2016 general election. Will Forte, Mandy Moore, and David Ortiz were the guests, with a special appearance by Weekend Update co-anchor Colin Jost. The show opened with a brief monologue, followed by an extended "A Closer Look" segment about the night's debate. It was the first live episode to go as planned, with no impromptu mishaps or swears.

The fourth live episode followed the 2018 midterm elections. Chris Hayes was originally announced to be the guest, but was replaced by Billy Eichner and Soledad O'Brien in the live version. The episode also featured an extended "A Closer Look" segment about the results of the elections and a live "Amber Says What" segment with writer Amber Ruffin.

The fifth live episode followed the 2019 State of the Union Address. The episode featured guests Taylor Schilling and Ana Navarro, with an extended "A Closer Look" segment about the Address and a live "Jokes Seth Can't Tell" segment.

Episodes

Reception

Ratings 

Late Night with Seth Meyers premiered to high ratings. It debuted to 3.4 million viewers and a 1.4 rating among the key demographic of adults aged 18–49—the best ratings for the Late Night franchise since January 2005. Several months into its run, the show averaged 1.5 million viewers nightly, which was slightly down from Fallon's final average as host. It remained at the same average one year later, in July 2015.

Critical reception 
The show initially received mixed reviews. The Hollywood Reporters Tim Goodman referred to Meyers' monologue as "staccato and hit and miss—sounding more like his 'Weekend Update' bits rather than a real monologue." On the other hand, USA Todays Robert Bianco felt Meyers was "shifting the show to suit his talents," making the show stronger and more traditional than Fallon's. Reviewing the debut week, The A.V. Club gave a B grade: The show begins with, "essentially, a carbon copy of Meyers' Weekend Update / 'what's in the news' jokes [...] Meyers will settle in to the formulaic parts of this job quickly enough—he's a pro, and it shows... " A month later, Jeff Jensen of Entertainment Weekly gave the program a B+ and wrote, "In his first week, the very smart, very smiley former Saturday Night Live head writer gave stiff monologue, which was basically his Weekend Update newsreader shtick, delivered in his shouty, wiseassy, talk-to-the-camera manner, but standing up; he improved the more he connected with the studio audience. He rolls when sitting down. Meyers seems capable of creating chemistry and having quality chats with anyone, from riding the wild waves of Kanye West to spinning a funny anecdote with pal Brad Paisley about accidentally stealing a Porsche."

Reviews have grown more positive as the show has evolved. In 2015, David Sims of The Atlantic wrote that the program "quietly [became] a heavy hitter, mixing a solid monologue with great scripted and semi-improvised bits from its writers." The Wall Street Journal Sophia Hollander, with regard to the show's emphasis on authors, considered it "something of an intellectual salon, with authors and biting political commentary as well as celebrities." Bruce Fretts of New York felt the show distinguished itself from its contemporaries with a heavier focus on politics.

The 2016 election cycle allowed the show to further increase its focus on politics, satirizing the daily news both in the monologue and longform "A Closer Look" segments. At the behest of NBC executives, Late Night does not attempt to "equally cover" the news. Rather, jokes and segments are written openly from Meyers' more liberal viewpoint. This is also, in part, to help distinguish the show from its lead-in, The Tonight Show Starring Jimmy Fallon, which attempts to skewer from an unbiased perspective. Meyers' transition from broad appeal comedy to his personal views has been critically praised, saying that the show has been able to find its own footing more in these political pieces. Conversely, Jonny Coleman of LA Weekly called Meyers a "purveyor of toxic fluff" who has "demonstrated zero political efficacy." Dave Itzkoff of The New York Times praised "A Closer Look" and Meyers for embracing a more political style, noting "This approach has helped "Late Night," which was drawing more than 1.6 million viewers at the end of last year, stand out in a crowded field of competitors, and has earned Mr. Meyers praise from viewers, critics and his fellow hosts."

The show has received four Primetime Emmy Award nominations for writing, and two for directing. In 2022, Late Night with Seth Meyers received its first Outstanding Variety Talk Series nomination.

Broadcast 
In MENA Countries, the show airs on OSN First Comedy HD, And re-airs two hours after the presentation on OSN First Comedy +2.

The show started airing across Europe on CNBC Europe from November 1, 2016 at 23:00 GMT (00:00 CET), as a replacement for The Tonight Show Starring Jimmy Fallon which used to occupy the same slot, however from November 2016 the Tonight Show has exclusive broadcast rights across Europe on the E! channel so Late Night was chosen as its replacement.

The show airs on CNBC Europe Mondays to Fridays at 22:30 GMT/BST (23:30 CET). Episodes now air in an uncut one hour format, airing episodes on a one-day delay from US transmission. On Saturdays and Sundays, episodes of the show air in an uncut one hour format from 20:00 GMT/BST (21:00 CET) with three episodes airing on a Saturday and three episodes airing on a Sunday. The weekend episodes are from editions which had aired around a week before across the USA.

In Hong Kong and Southeast Asia, the show airs on Rock Entertainment from weeknights at 23:30 HKT (22:30 for THA/WIB), 12 hours after its U.S. telecast (with the Friday episode airs on Monday).

References

External links 

 
Works by Seth Meyers
Meyers, Seth
2014 American television series debuts
2010s American late-night television series
2020s American late-night television series
2010s American political comedy television series
2020s American political comedy television series
2010s American satirical television series
2020s American satirical television series
2010s American television talk shows
2020s American television talk shows
2010s American variety television series
2020s American variety television series
American television shows featuring puppetry
English-language television shows
NBC original programming
Political satirical television series
Television productions suspended due to the COVID-19 pandemic
Television series by Universal Television
Television series by Broadway Video
Television shows filmed in New York City